The Kamloops Formation is a geologic formation in British Columbia. It preserves fossils dating back to the Paleogene period.

See also

 List of fossiliferous stratigraphic units in British Columbia

References
 

Paleogene British Columbia